The Hoover Institution (officially The Hoover Institution on War, Revolution, and Peace; abbreviated as Hoover) is an American public policy think tank and research institution that promotes personal and economic liberty, free enterprise, and limited government. While the institution is formally a unit of Stanford University, it maintains an independent board of overseers and relies on its own income and donations. It is widely described as a conservative institution, although its directors have contested its partisanship.

In 1919, the institution began as a library founded by Stanford alumnus Herbert Hoover prior to his presidency in order to house his archives gathered during the Great War. The Hoover Tower, an icon of Stanford University, was built to house the archives, then known as the Hoover War Collection (now the Hoover Institution Library and Archives), and contained material related to World War I, World War II, and other global events. The collection was renamed and transformed into a research institution and think tank in the mid-20th century. Its mission, as described by Herbert Hoover in 1959, is "to recall the voice of experience against the making of war, and by the study of these records and their publication, to recall man's endeavors to make and preserve peace, and to sustain for America the safeguards of the American way of life."

The Hoover Institution has been a place of scholarship for individuals who previously held significant positions in government. Notable Hoover fellows and alumni include Nobel Prize laureates Henry Kissinger, Milton Friedman, and Gary Becker; economist Thomas Sowell, scholars Niall Ferguson and Richard Epstein, and former Speaker of the House of Representatives Newt Gingrich. In 2020, former U.S. Secretary of State Condoleezza Rice became the institution's director. It divides its fellows into separate research teams to work on various subjects, including Economic Policy, History, Education, and Law. It publishes research through its own university press, the Hoover Institution Press.

In 2021, Hoover was ranked as the 10th most influential think tank in the world by Academic Influence. It was ranked 22nd on the "Top Think Tanks in United States" and 1st on the "Top Think Tanks to Look Out For" lists of the Think Tanks and Civil Societies Program that same year.

History

Early history 
In June 1919, Herbert Hoover, then a wealthy engineer who was one of Stanford's first graduates, sent a telegram offering Stanford president Ray Lyman Wilbur $50,000 in order to support the collection of primary materials related to World War I, a project that became known as the Hoover War Collection. Supported primarily by gifts from private donors, the Hoover War Collection flourished in its early years. In 1922, the collection became known as the Hoover War Library (now the Hoover Institution Library and Archives) and had collected a variety of rare and unpublished material, including the files of the Okhrana, as well as a plurality of government documents. It was originally housed in the Stanford Library, separate from the general stacks. In his memoirs, Hoover wrote:I did a vast amount of reading, mostly on previous wars, revolutions, and peace-makings of Europe and especially the political and economic aftermaths. At one time I set up some research at London, Paris, and Berlin into previous famines in Europe to see if there had developed any ideas on handling relief and pestilence. ... I was shortly convinced that gigantic famine would follow the present war. The steady degeneration of agriculture was obvious. ... I read in one of Andrew D. White's writings that most of the fugitive literature of comment during the French Revolution was lost to history because no one set any value on it at the time, and that without such material it became very difficult or impossible to reconstruct the real scene. Therein lay the origins of the Library on War, Revolution and Peace at Stanford University.By 1926, the Hoover War Library was the largest library in the world devoted to the Great War. It contained 1.4 million items and was becoming too large to house in the Stanford Library so the university allocated $600,000 for the construction of the Hoover Tower, which was to be its permanent home independent of the Stanford Library system. The 285-foot tall tower was completed in 1941 on date of the university's golden jubilee. The tower has since been an icon of the Stanford campus.

Expansion and later history 
In 1956, former President Hoover, under the auspices of the Institution and Library, launched a major fundraising campaign that transitioned the organization to its current form as a think tank and archive. In 1957, the Hoover Institution and Library was renamed the Hoover Institution on War, Revolution and Peace—the name it holds today. In 1959 Stanford's Board of Trustees officially established the Hoover Institution as "an independent institution within the frame of Stanford University." In 1960, W. Glenn Campbell was appointed director and substantial budget increases soon led to corresponding increases in acquisitions and related research projects. In particular, the Chinese and Russian collections grew considerably. Despite student unrest in the 1960s, the institution continued to develop closer relations with Stanford.

Reagan governorship (1967–1975) and presidency (1981–1989) 
In 1975, Ronald Reagan, who was Governor of California at that time, was designated as Hoover’s first honorary fellow. He donated his gubernatorial papers to the Hoover library. During that time the Hoover Institution held a general budget of $3.5 million a year. In 1976, one third of Stanford University's book holdings were housed at the Hoover library. At that time, it was the largest private archive collection in the United States. For his presidential campaign in 1980, Reagan engaged at least thirteen Hoover scholars to support the campaign in multiple capacities. After Reagan won the election campaign, more than thirty current or former Hoover Institution fellows worked for the Reagan administration in 1981.

In 1989, Campbell retired as director of Hoover and replaced by John Raisian, a change that was seen as the end of an era. Raisan served as director until 2015, and was succeeded by Thomas W. Gilligan.

George W. Bush administration (2001–2009)

President George W. Bush awarded the National Humanities Medal to the Hoover Institution in 2006.

Trump administration (2017–2021) 
The Trump administration maintained close ties with the institution and multiple Hoover affiliates were assigned top positions in government. Scott Atlas, one Hoover fellow, was known for pushing against public health measures as a top Trump advisor in the COVID-19 pandemic, and was condemned in a Stanford faculty vote.

In August 2017 the David and Joan Traitel Building was inaugurated. The ground floor is a conference center with a 400-seat auditorium and the top floor houses the Hoover Institution's headquarters.

In 2020, Condoleezza Rice succeeded Thomas W. Gilligan as director.

Present 
At any given time the Hoover Institution has up to 200 resident scholars known as Fellows. They are an interdisciplinary group studying political science, education, economics, foreign policy, energy, history, law, national security, health and politics. Some hold joint appointments as lecturers on the Stanford faculty.

During Stanford University faculty senate discussions on closer collaboration between the university and the Institution in 2021, Rice "addressed campus criticism that the Hoover Institution is a partisan think tank that primarily supports conservative administrations and policy positions" by sharing "statistics that show Hoover fellows contribute financially to both political parties on an equal basis", according to the university's newsletter.

Campus 
The Institution has libraries which include materials from both the First World War and Second World War, including the collection of documents of President Hoover, which he began to collect at the Paris Peace Conference of 1919. Thousands of Persian books, official documents, letters, multimedia pieces and other materials on Iran's history, politics and culture can also be found at the Stanford University library and the Hoover Institution library.

Publications 
The Hoover Institution's in-house publisher, Hoover Institution Press, produces publications on public policy topics, including the quarterly periodicals Hoover Digest, Education Next, China Leadership Monitor, and Defining Ideas. The Hoover Institution Press previously published the bimonthly periodical Policy Review, which it acquired from The Heritage Foundation in 2001. Policy Review ceased publication with its February–March 2013 issue.

The Hoover Institution Press also publishes books and essays by Hoover Institution fellows and other Hoover-affiliated scholars.

Funding
The Hoover Institution receives nearly half of its funding from private gifts, primarily from individual contributions, and the other half from its endowment.

Funders of the organization include the Taube Family Foundation, the Koret Foundation, the Howard Charitable Foundation, the Sarah Scaife Foundation, the Walton Foundation, the Lynde and Harry Bradley Foundation, and the William E. Simon Foundation.

Details
Funding sources and expenditures, FY 2022

{{Pie chart
 |thumb = right
 |caption='Funding Sources, FY 2022: $78,800,000
 |other = 
 |label1 = Expendable Gifts
 |value1 = 51 |color1 = aqua
 |label2 = Endowment Payout
 |value2 = 42 |color2 = lightcyan
 |label3 = Misc. Income and Stanford Support
 |value3 = 3 |color3 = aquamarine
 |label4 = Revenue from Prior Periods
 |value4 =4 |color4 = mediumturquoise
}}

 Members 
In May 2018, the Hoover Institution's website listed 198 fellows.

Below is a list of directors and some of the more prominent fellows, former and current.

Directors

 Ephraim D. Adams, 1920–25
 Ralph H. Lutz, 1925–44
 Harold H. Fisher, 1944–52
 C. Easton Rothwell, 1952–59
 W. Glenn Campbell, 1960–89
 John Raisian, 1989–2015
 Thomas W. Gilligan, 2015 – September 2020
 Condoleezza Rice, September 2020 – present

Honorary Fellows
 Margaret Thatcher, former Prime Minister of the United Kingdom (deceased)
 Ronald Reagan, former President of the United States (deceased)
 Aleksandr Solzhenitsyn, Soviet dissident and Nobel laureate in literature (deceased)
 Friedrich Hayek, philosopher and Nobel laureate in economics (deceased)

Distinguished Fellows
 George P. Shultz, former U.S. Secretary of State (deceased)

Senior Fellows

 Fouad Ajami, political scientist, former director of the Middle East Studies Program at Johns Hopkins University (deceased)
 Scott Atlas, health care policy scholar and physician, former professor and former Chief of Neuroradiology at Stanford University School of Medicine
 Richard V. Allen, former U.S. National Security Advisor
 Martin Anderson, former advisor to Richard Nixon and author of The Federal Bulldozer (deceased)
 Robert Barro, economist
 Lee Ohanion, economist
 Gary S. Becker, 1992 Nobel laureate in economics (deceased)
 Joseph Berger, theoretical sociologist
 Peter Berkowitz, political scientist
 Russell Berman, professor of German Studies and Comparative Literature
 Michael Boskin, chairman of the Council of Economic Advisers under President George H. W. Bush
 David W. Brady, political scientist
 Bruce Bueno de Mesquita, political scientist, professor at New York University
 Elizabeth Cobbs, historian, novelist, and documentary filmmaker
 John H. Cochrane, economist
 William Damon, professor of education
 Larry Diamond, political scientist, professor at Stanford University
 Frank Dikötter, chair professor of humanities at the University of Hong Kong
 Sidney Drell, theoretical physicist and arms control expert (deceased)
 Darrell Duffie, Dean Witter Distinguished Professor of Finance at Stanford University's Graduate School of Business
 John B. Dunlop, expert on Soviet and Russian politics
 Richard A. Epstein, legal scholar
 Martin Feldstein, senior fellow at the George F. Baker Professor of Economics at Harvard University (Deceased)
 Niall Ferguson, historian, professor at Harvard University
 Chester E. Finn, Jr., professor of education
 Morris P. Fiorina, political scientist
 Milton Friedman, 1976 Nobel laureate in economics (deceased)
 Timothy Garton Ash, historian, columnist for The Guardian Jack Goldsmith, legal scholar
 Stephen Haber, economic historian and political scientist
 Robert Hall, economist
 Victor Davis Hanson, classicist, military historian, columnist
 Eric Hanushek, economist
 David R. Henderson, economist
 Caroline Hoxby, economist
 Bobby Ray Inman, retired admiral
 Shanto Iyengar, professor of political science, and director of the Political Communication Laboratory at Stanford University
 Ken Jowitt, historian
 Kenneth L. Judd, economist
 Daniel P. Kessler, scholar of health policy and health care finance
 Stephen D. Krasner, international relations professor
 Edward Lazear, economist (Deceased) 
 Gary D. Libecap, Bren Professor of Corporate Environmental Policy and of Donald R. Bren School of Environmental Science
 Seymour Martin Lipset, political sociologist (deceased)
 Harvey Mansfield, political scientist
 Michael W. McConnell, legal scholar, former judge, professor at Stanford University
 Michael McFaul, political scientist, United States Ambassador to Russia
 H.R. McMaster, former National Security Advisor
 Thomas Metzger, sinologist
 James C. Miller III, economist
 Terry M. Moe, professor of political science at Stanford University
 Kevin M. Murphy, economist
 Norman Naimark, historian
 Douglass North, 1993 Nobel laureate in economics (deceased)
 William J. Perry, former U.S. Secretary of Defense
 Paul E. Peterson, scholar on education reform
 Alvin Rabushka, political scientist
 Raghuram Rajan, Katherine Dusak Miller Distinguished Service Professor of Finance at the University of Chicago's Booth School
 Condoleezza Rice, former U.S. Secretary of State
 Henry Rowen, economist (deceased)
 Thomas J. Sargent, 2011 Nobel laureate in economics, professor at New York University
 Robert Service, historian
 John Shoven, economist
 Abraham David Sofaer, scholar, former legal advisor to the U.S. Secretary of State
 Thomas Sowell, economist, author, columnist
 Michael Spence, 2001 Nobel laureate in economics
 Richard F. Staar, political scientist, historian (Deceased)
 Shelby Steele, author, columnist
 John B. Taylor, former U.S. Undersecretary of the Treasury for international affairs
 Barry R. Weingast, political scientist
 Bertram Wolfe, author, scholar, former communist, (deceased; 1896–1977)
 Amy Zegart, political scientist

Research Fellows

 Ayaan Hirsi Ali, author, scholar and former politician
 Clint Bolick, Associate Justice of the Supreme Court of Arizona
 Lanhee Chen, political scientist, health policy expert, former policy director for Mitt Romney
 Robert Conquest, historian (deceased)
 David Davenport, former president of Pepperdine University
 Williamson Evers, education researcher
 Paul R. Gregory, Cullen Professor Emeritus in the Department of Economics at the University of Houston
 Alice Hill, former federal prosecutor, judge, special assistant to the president, and senior director for the National Security Council
 Charles Hill, lecturer in International Studies (Deceased)
 Tim Kane, economist
 Herbert S. Klein, historian
 Tod Lindberg, foreign policy expert
 Alice L. Miller, political scientist
 Shavit Matias, former deputy attorney general of Israel
 Abbas Milani, political scientist
 Henry I. Miller, physician
 Elena Pastorino, economist
 Russell Roberts, economist, author
 Kori Schake, foreign policy expert, author
 Kiron Skinner, associate professor of international relations and political science, author
 Peter Schweizer, author (former fellow)
 Antony C. Sutton, author of Western Technology and Soviet Economic Development (3 vol), fellow from 1968 to 1973
 Bruce Thornton, American classicist
 Tunku Varadarajan, writer and journalist

Distinguished Visiting Fellows

 John Abizaid, former commander of the U.S. Central Command (former fellow)
 Spencer Abraham, former U.S. Senator and Secretary of Energy (former fellow)
 Pedro Aspe, Mexican economist, former secretary of finance
 Michael R. Auslin, American writer, policy analyst, historian, and Asia expert
 Michael D. Bordo, Canadian economist, professor of economics at Rutgers University
 Charles Calomiris, financial policy expert, author, and professor at Columbia Business School
 Arye Carmon, Founding President and senior fellow at the Israel Democracy Institute (IDI)
 Elizabeth Economy, C. V. Starr senior fellow and director for Asia studies at the Council on Foreign Relations
 James O. Ellis, former commander, United States Strategic Command
 James Goodby, author and former American diplomat
 Jim Hoagland, American journalist and two-time recipient of the Pulitzer Prize
 Toomas Hendrik Ilves, former President of Estonia
 Raymond Jeanloz, professor of earth and planetary science and of astronomy
 Josef Joffe, publisher-editor of the German newspaper Die Zeit Henry Kissinger, former United States Secretary of State in the administrations of presidents Richard Nixon and Gerald Ford
 James Mattis, former commander, U.S. Central Command and former Secretary of Defense 
 Allan H. Meltzer, American economist (Deceased)
 Edwin Meese, former U.S. Attorney General
 David C. Mulford, former United States Ambassador to India, former Vice-Chairman International of Credit Suisse
 Joseph Nye, American political scientist, co-founder of the international relations theory of neoliberalism
 Sam Nunn, former United States Senator from Georgia
 George Osborne, British Conservative Party politician, former Chancellor of the Exchequer and former Member of Parliament (MP) for Tatton
 Andrew Roberts, British historian and journalist, Visiting Professor at the Department of War Studies, King's College London
 Peter M. Robinson, American author, research fellow television host, former speechwriter for then-Vice President George H. W. Bush and President Ronald Reagan
 Gary Roughead, former Chief of Naval Operations
 Donald Rumsfeld, former Secretary of Defense (deceased)
 Christopher Stubbs, an experimental physicist
 William Suter, former Clerk of the Supreme Court of the United States
 Kevin Warsh, former governor of the Federal Reserve System
 Pete Wilson, former Governor of California

Visiting Fellows

 Alexander Benard, American businessman, lawyer, and commentator on U.S. public policy
 Charles Blahous, U.S. public trustee for the Social Security and Medicare programs
 Robert J. Hodrick, U.S. economist specialized in International Finance
 Markos Kounalakis, Greek-American journalist, author, scholar, and the Second Gentleman of California
 Bjørn Lomborg, Danish author, president of Copenhagen Consensus Center
 Ellen R. McGrattan, professor of economics at the University of Minnesota
 Afshin Molavi, Iranian-American author and expert on global geo-political risk and geo-economics
 Charles I. Plosser, former president of the Federal Reserve Bank of Philadelphia
 Raj Shah, former White House Deputy Press Secretary, former Deputy Assistant to the President
 Alex Stamos, computer scientist, former chief security officer at Facebook
 John Yoo, Korean-American attorney, law professor, former government official, author
 Glennys Young, American international relations scholar

Media Fellows

 Tom Bethell, journalist
 Sam Dealey, journalist, former editor-in-chief of Washington Times Christopher Hitchens, journalist (deceased)
 Deroy Murdock, journalist
 Mike Pride, editor emeritus of the Concord Monitor and former administrator of the Pulitzer Prizes
 Christopher Ruddy, CEO of Newsmax Media

National Fellows
 Mark Bils, macroeconomist, National Fellow 1989–90
 Stephen Kotkin, historian, National Fellow 2010–11

Senior Research Fellows

 John H. Bunzel, expert in the field of civil rights, race relations, higher education, US politics, and elections (deceased)
 Robert Hessen, historian
 James Stockdale, Navy Vice Admiral, Medal of Honor recipient, 1992 US vice presidential candidate (deceased) 
 Charles Wolf, Jr, economist (deceased)
 Edward Teller, physicist (deceased)

Footnotes

See also
 List of Stanford University Centers and Institutes

References

Further reading
 Paul, Gary Norman. "The Development of the Hoover Institution on War, Revolution, and Peace Library, 1919–1944". PhD dissertation U. of California, Berkeley. Dissertation Abstracts International'' 1974 35(3): 1682–1683a, 274 pp.

External links
 
 
 hoover.org/hila, the Hoover Institution Library and Archives official website
 hooverpress.org, the Hoover Institution Press's official website
 definingideas.org, a Hoover Institution online journal
 EDIRC listing (provided by RePEc)
 
 advancingafreesociety.org, the Hoover Institution's blog of research and opinion on current policy matters
 Video of Hoover Institution events and Uncommon Knowledge at YouTube
 Video of Hoover Institution events at FORA.tv
 Hoover Institution FBI files hosted at the Internet Archive

 
Organizations established in 1919
Political and economic think tanks in the United States
Foreign policy and strategy think tanks in the United States
Non-profit organizations based in California
National Humanities Medal recipients
Conservative organisations in the United Kingdom
1919 establishments in California
Conservative organizations in the United States
Conservatism in the United Kingdom